Al-Heraki is a village in central Syria, administratively part of the Homs Governorate, located northeast of Homs. Nearby localities include Umm al-Amad to the northwest, Umm Jbab and al-Mukharram to the north, Al-Sankari to the northeast, Furqlus to the southeast and al-Sayyid to the south. According to the Syria Central Bureau of Statistics (CBS), al-Heraki had a population of 2,238 in the 2004 census.

References

Populated places in al-Mukharram District